Michael Stafford may refer to:

 Maverick Sabre, born Michael Stafford, English-Irish singer, songwriter, and rapper
 Mike Stafford, character in film An American Affair
Michael Stafford, namesake of Stafford, Nebraska